Crimewatch or Crime Watch are television programs in different regions, usually made in conjunction with police and seeking information about unsolved crimes from the public.

Television shows
 Crimewatch, UK
 Crimewatch Live, UK
 Crimewatch File, UK
 Crimewatch Solved, UK
 Crime Limited, UK Crimewatch spin-off
 Crime Watch Daily, US, investigative news and reports on crime
 Crimewatch, Singapore
 Crime Watch, Trinidad and Tobago

See also
 Neighborhood watch, citizens' organizations watching out for crime in a neighborhood